Puniceibacterium sediminis is a gram-negative and rod-shaped bacterium from the genus of Puniceibacterium which has been isolated from sediments from the Sakhalin Island in Russia.

References 

Rhodobacteraceae
Bacteria described in 2015